Skor-Sten i den tidlösa tiden ("Shoe-Sten in the Timeless Time") was the 1987 edition of Sveriges Radio's Christmas Calendar.

Plot
It's the day before Christmas Eve. Sten wants to know what he will get for Christmas. He has invented a time machine which he thinks will take him to 23 February the upcoming year. But instead, he ends up in a series of adventures across time and space.

References
 

1987 radio programme debuts
1987 radio programme endings
Fiction about time travel
Sveriges Radio's Christmas Calendar
Works by Anders Jacobsson and Sören Olsson